The 1986 United States Senate election in Nevada was held on November 4, 1986. Incumbent Republican U.S. Senator Paul Laxalt decided to retire instead of seeking a third term. The Democratic nominee, U.S. representative Harry Reid won the open seat.

General election

Candidates 

 Kent Cromwell (Libertarian)
 Harry Reid, U.S. Representative from Nevada's 1st congressional district (Democratic)
 Jim Santini, former Democratic U.S. Representative at-large (Republican)

Results

See also 
 1986 United States Senate elections

References 

Nevada
1980
1986 Nevada elections